CA-Cricket Presents (formerly Xerox Presents originally from Xerox Desktop Software) was a presentation program developed for Apple Macintosh and Microsoft Windows by Cricket Software. 

Cricket Software was later acquired by Computer Associates. CA-Cricket Graph was an associated chart program. The program competed with PowerPoint.

Presentation files used the filename extension .cpp while .cpt was used by template files.

References
Infoworld - Google Books June 1, 1992, pp 78-79 
Newsbytes News Network, March 22, 1990  by Grant Buckler
http://www.file-extensions.org/search/?searchstring=CA-Cricket+Presents

External links

Discontinued software
Presentation software
CA Technologies